was a Japanese Christian socialist, parliamentarian and pacifist. He largely contributed to development of baseball in Japan, and was called "Father of Japanese baseball." He created a baseball club of Waseda University.

Early life and education
Abe was born in Fukuoka on 4 February 1865. He entered at Doshisha University in 1879, and got baptized by Joseph Hardy Neesima at February 2, 1882. In 1898, he created the first Consumers' co-operative of university in Japan at Doshisha. After he graduated from Doshissha, he studied abroad, including at the University of Berlin, before attending Hartford Theological Seminary in Hartford, Connecticut. It was while he was studying in Hartford that he became interested in socialism.

Career
After returning to Japan, in 1899, Abe became a Unitarian preacher. He taught at the Waseda University starting in 1901, called Tokyo Semmon Gakko, at the time. He later became a faculty of political science and economics and taught there for 25 years. He occupied some important positions in the university like a dean of first School of Political Science and Economics and University Vice President. In 1901 he helped to found the short-lived Japanese Social-Democratic party, which the government swiftly prohibited.

During the Russo-Japanese War, he advocated non-cooperation and participated in various early feminist movements. When the anti-war newspaper Heimin Shimbun (People's Weekly News) was banned, he started his own magazine, Shinkigen (A New Era). He used this as a soapbox to promote parliamentary socialism. In 1906, he played an instrumental role in founding the first Japanese Socialist Party, from which he advocated a Christian Socialist viewpoint. However, the government outlawed this party too in 1907. He dropped out of public life until after World War I, when he became active again. He founded the Japanese Fabian Society, in 1921, and in 1924, he became their first President. He resigned his teaching post to become the secretary-general of the Social Democratic Party. In 1928, he was elected to the Japanese Diet, where he held a seat for five consecutive elections. In 1932, he became a chairman of Shakai Taishuto (Social Mass Party). He withdrew from politics in 1940 due to the increasingly militaristic nature of the government of the time.

Father of Baseball in Japan
He contributed to development and spread of baseball in japan, because he believed that personality was built with sports, like knowledge built with learning. Becoming the first manager of Waseda Baseball Club in 1901, he started Waseda–Keio rivalry. In 1905, during Russo-Japanese War, he took the team to the United States, and brought many techniques to Japan. He didn't keep the techniques secret, but spread them all over Japan with his books. He also established the Japan Amateur Sports Association(later Japan Sport Association) together with Jigoro Kano. Besides, he helped organizing of the first Olympic team of Japan competing at the Stockholm Olympic games in 1912. In 1930, he became the first chairman of Tokyo Big6 Baseball League.

He is called 'Father of Baseball in Japan' or 'Father of Student Baseball' in Japan because of such contribution. Totsuka Ground, the main stadium of Waseda's baseball team, was changed its name to Abe Ground when he died in 1949. When Japanese Baseball Hall of Fame was opened in 1959, he was inducted into the hall.

See also
 Shinkigen

References

1865 births
1949 deaths
Doshisha University alumni
Humboldt University of Berlin alumni
Japanese Baseball Hall of Fame inductees
Japanese Christian pacifists
Japanese Christian socialists
Japanese Protestants
Japanese socialist feminists
Members of the House of Representatives (Empire of Japan)
Non-interventionism
People from Fukuoka
Politicians from Fukuoka Prefecture
Unitarian socialists
Academic staff of Waseda University
Meiji socialists